War Requiem is a 1989 film adaptation of Benjamin Britten's musical piece of the same name.

It was shot in 1988 by the British film director Derek Jarman with the 1963 recording as the soundtrack, produced by Don Boyd and financed by the BBC. Decca Records required that the 1963 recording be heard on its own, with no overlaid soundtrack or other sound effects.  The film featured Nathaniel Parker as Wilfred Owen, and Laurence Olivier in his last acting appearance before his death in July 1989. The film is structured as the reminiscences of Olivier's character, the Old Soldier in a wheelchair, and Olivier recites "Strange Meeting" in the film's prologue.

Cast

 Laurence Olivier (Old Soldier)
 Nathaniel Parker (Wilfred Owen)
 Tilda Swinton (Nurse)
 Sean Bean (German Soldier)
 Nigel Terry (Abraham)
 Patricia Hayes (Mother)
 Owen Teale (Unknown Soldier)
 Jodie Graber (Young boy soldier)
 Spencer Leigh (Soldier 1)

Filming
Shooting for the film took place at Darenth Park Hospital in Kent, beginning 17 October 1988 and lasting for 18 days. It was released on the following dates in English-speaking countries:
 United Kingdom, 6 January 1989
 Canada, 12 September 1989
 United States, 26 January 1990.

Video

The film was released on VHS and Laserdisc in 1990, but because of its limited release, copies are quite rare. A US (Region 1/NTSC) DVD is available from Kino International. The film has been released on UK Region 2 DVD featuring a Making of War Requiem documentary and interviews with Swinton, Parker and Don Boyd (who also provides an audio commentary). A DVD has also been released in Japan.

References

External links 

1989 films
Films directed by Derek Jarman
Benjamin Britten
1980s English-language films
1980s British films